James M. Wilson is a biomedical researcher with expertise in gene therapy. Wilson graduated from Albion College (B.A., Chemistry) and the University of Michigan (MD, PhD).  He completed residency training in Internal Medicine at the Massachusetts General Hospital followed by a postdoctoral fellowship at the Whitehead Institute.

Wilson serves as the Director of the Gene Therapy Program, Rose H. Weiss Professor and Director of the Orphan Disease Center, and Professor of Medicine and Pediatrics at the Perelman School of Medicine at the University of Pennsylvania. Previously, he held the John Herr Musser endowed professorship at the Perelman School of Medicine.
  
Wilson led a clinical trial that resulted in the death of Jesse Gelsinger. As a result, the government banned him from working on FDA-regulated human clinical trials for five years, which led to a shift in his research focus towards a study of adeno-associated viruses (AAV).

Scientific contributions
Wilson’s research involves the development of viral-based gene therapies for genetic diseases. A major research focus is the generation of novel vectors for improved transduction efficiencies and regulated expression, as well as the elucidation of host immune responses to viral vectors. His work emphasizes the creation of vectors for in vivo gene therapy concentrating on adeno-associated viruses. This work began with the discovery in his laboratory of a new family of primate AAVs; over 120 new AAV capsids were rescued as latent genomes from primate tissues and studied for their biology and potential as vectors. This has led to an enhanced understanding of vector host interactions and a new generation of vectors with substantially improved performance profiles beyond that provided from the original 6 AAV isolates. More recently, Wilson’s laboratory has used AAV to accomplish successful in vivo genome editing.

As of 2018, his laboratory’s translational research portfolio included more than 30 orphan disease programs.

References

External links 
Gene Therapy Program at the University of Pennsylvania: University of Pennsylvania Gene Therapy Program | Home

Orphan Disease Center at the University of Pennsylvania: Orphan Disease Center | Home

Living people
American geneticists
Albion College alumni
University of Michigan Medical School alumni
University of Pennsylvania faculty
Year of birth missing (living people)
Perelman School of Medicine at the University of Pennsylvania faculty